Engeren is a lake in Innlandet county, Norway. The  lake lies on the border of the municipalities of Engerdal and Trysil. The Norwegian County Road 26 runs along the eastern shore of the lake.

See also
List of lakes in Norway

References

Engerdal
Trysil
Lakes of Innlandet